Yelena Sergeyevna Bondarchuk (31 July 1962 – 7 November 2009) was a Soviet and Russian stage and film actress.

Biography
She was one of three children born to actors Sergei Bondarchuk (1920–1994, died from heart attack) and Irina Skobtseva (1927–2020). Her half-sister is actress Natalya Bondarchuk and her younger brother is the actor Fyodor Bondarchuk (born 1967). She had one child, a son, by her marriage to Vitaly Kryukov, which ended in divorce.

Death
She died of breast cancer on 7 November 2009, aged 47.

Filmography

References

External links

 Елена (Алёна) Бондарчук. Биографическая справка 

1962 births
2009 deaths
Burials at Novodevichy Cemetery
Actresses from Moscow
Yelena
Soviet film actresses
Soviet television actresses
Russian film actresses
Russian television actresses
Deaths from breast cancer
Deaths from cancer in Russia
Sergei Bondarchuk
Moscow Art Theatre School alumni